Inez Bensusan (1871–1967) was an Australian born Jewish actress, playwright and suffragette in the UK. She was a leader of the Actresses' Franchise League and the Jewish League for Woman Suffrage.

Life
Bensusan was born in Sydney, Australia on 11 September 1871. Her father, Samuel Levy Bensusan was an agent for miners and her mother was Julia Rosa, née Vallentine. After studying at University of Sydney, she and her family moved to England in 1894 and soon after, she joined an acting troupe. Over the following years, she performed in plays around the world, in England, USA and Australia. Between 1906 until 1938, she would go on to appear in more than fifty plays in the West End.

She became a member of Emmeline Pankhurst's Women's Social and Political Union and in 1907 she was one of the founder members of the Actresses' Franchise League. She wrote three one-act plays for the League and she was head of their play department.

In 1911 the suffragists were objecting to the census. As part their protest The Apple was performed at one o'clock in the morning. This was the second time that play was performed.

The following year she was on the executive committee of the Jewish League for Woman Suffrage.

In December 1913 she formed a women's theatre troupe at the Coronet Theatre. The group had one successful season but the project was interrupted by the outbreak of war. Her Women's Theatre Company went on to entertain the army of Occupation in Cologne.

In 1946 she co-founded the House of Arts in Chiswick.

Film roles
 The Grit of a Jew (1917)
 Adam Bede (1918)

Works
 The Apple (1909)
 Perfect Ladies (1909)
 Nobody's Sweetheart (1911)
 The Prodigal Passes (1914)
 The Singer of the Veldt
 True Womanhood (a film) (1911).

References

1871 births
1967 deaths
Actresses from Sydney
19th-century Sephardi Jews
20th-century Sephardi Jews
20th-century Australian actresses
Australian film actresses
Australian Sephardi Jews
20th-century Australian dramatists and playwrights
Australian suffragists
Jewish Australian actresses
Jewish Australian writers
Jewish feminists
Jewish women writers
Jewish dramatists and playwrights
20th-century Australian women writers
Australian expatriates in the United Kingdom
19th-century Australian women
Jewish suffragists
Jewish women activists